Josefina Passadori (5 April 1900 – 13 December 1987) was an Italian-Argentine academic, educator, and writer. She published several textbooks as well as poetry under the pen name Fröken Thelma.

Biography

Passadori was born in Mezzanino, Pavia, Italy. In 1922, she graduated from La Unidad Académica Escuela Normal Superior N° 1 Mary O. Graham in La Plata, where she taught for almost forty years (Spanish, Italian, History, Geography and Literature). 

She also worked for other schools, such as Escuela Normal Superior María Inmaculada in La Plata; Escuela Nº 18 del Consejo Escolar Nº14 in Buenos Aires; School of Journalism of the Universidad Nacional de La Plata; and the Universidad Popular Sarmiento, for which she was the President for several years.

At the age of twenty, she founded the first Latin American school cooperative, of which she was also the first president. She headed many other cultural institutions, including the Arts Society. She served as Education Undersecretary in the province of Buenos Aires.

Passadori published hundreds of articles in El Argentino, El Día, and Revista del Suboficial; gave conferences; and sponsored the "Ediciones del Bosque", an organization which promoted and published intellectuals in Buenos Aires, including Raúl Amaral, María Dhialma Tiberti, and María de Villarino, among others. She published over 30 textbooks, some in collaboration with other authors, such as the Manual del Alumno used by many generations in Argentina.

Passadori died in San Isidro, Argentina, on 13 December 1987, aged 87.

Works
Elementos de geografía (1940)
El universo y los países (1941)
Geografía de América (1938)
Geografía General y de Asia y Africa (1942)
El Continente Americano (1939)
El Mundo Actual (1955)
El Universo y la Argentina (1939)
Argentina (1939)
Manual de Geografía Americana (1941)
Nociones de Geografía Astronómica, General, y de Asia y Africa (1949)
El territorio Argentino (1943)
Geografía Universal (1944)
Geografía Americana (1944)

Sources
Diccionario biográfico, C Signo Editorial Argentino, Buenos Aires, Argentina, 1954, p. 292
 Sosa de Newton, Lily, Diccionario biográfico de mujeres argentinas, Editorial Plus Ultra, Buenos Aires, Argentina, 1980, p. 344

1900 births
1987 deaths
Italian emigrants to Argentina
Italian expatriates in Argentina
Naturalized citizens of Argentina
Argentine educators
Argentine women educators
Italian educators
Italian women educators
People from La Plata
20th-century Argentine women writers
20th-century Argentine writers
20th-century pseudonymous writers
Pseudonymous women writers